Astrotrichilia is a genus of plants in the family Meliaceae.

Species
 Astrotrichilia asterotricha 
 Astrotrichilia diegoensis 
 Astrotrichilia elegans 
 Astrotrichilia elliotii 
 Astrotrichilia masoalensis 
 Astrotrichilia parvifolia 
 Astrotrichilia procera 
 Astrotrichilia rakodomena 
 Astrotrichilia thouvenotii 
 Astrotrichilia valiandra 
 Astrotrichilia voamatata 
 Astrotrichilia zombitsyensis

References

External links
 
 Astrotrichilia at The Plant List
 Astrotrichilia at Tropicos

Meliaceae
Meliaceae genera